Rob Sgarlata is an American football coach and former player.  He is the head football coach at the Georgetown University and has held that position since 2014.

Rob Sgarlata's Coaching Resume

46 total All-Patriot League selections in each of first eight seasons, including nine in 2019. 
278 Hoyas have been named to the Patriot League Academic Honor Roll in his first six seasons, including a program-record 51 student-athletes in 2021.
Guided one player to CoSIDA Academic All-America status in 2021.
Won three games in the Lou Little Trophy series against Columbia University (2015, 2016, 2019), named after College Football Hall of Fame Coach Lou Little, who coached at both Georgetown and Columbia.
Helped develop five All-Americans – Michael Ononibaku (2005), Alex Buzbee (2006), Andrew Schaetzke (2011), Robert McCabe (2012) and Alec May (2014). 
Seven Hoyas have been invited to NFL rookie camps - Alex Buzbee, Andrew Schaetzke, Robert McCabe, Alec May, Dustin Wharton, Michael Dereus.

Rob Sgarlata (C'94, S'12) was named the 31st head football coach in GU program history in February 2014, becoming just the fourth person to have played football and graduated from Georgetown before earning the head coach title, joining Joe Reilly, Jack Hagerty and Maurice Dubofsky.

Three principles
Sgarlata has established a foundation for the program based on three principles
- 4 for 40 - a four-year commitment to Georgetown football leads to a 40-year relationship with special attention to their mind, body and spirit - Cura Personalis
- Men for Others - the Jesuit value of service to the community
- SISU - a Finnish phrase that translates into courage in the face of adversity

Over the Years
In his first eight years as head coach, Sgarlata has seen 46 student-athletes earn postseason All-Patriot League honors and 278 Georgetown football players have been named to the Patriot League Football Academic Honor Roll, including a program-record 51 student-athletes at the end of the 2020-21 school year.

In 2021, graduate student Ahmad Wilson became the first CoSIDA Academic All-American under Sgarlata's guidance.

In 2019, the Hoyas had a program-record nine players named to All-Patriot League teams. The GU defense finished the season ranked fourth in the country in scoring defense and pass efficiency defense, fifth in red zone defense, sixth in first down defense and seventh in total defense.

The Hoyas enjoyed one of the best improvements seasons in the country in 2018, finishing 5-6 overall and 4-2 in league play, the program’s best Patriot League record since joining the conference in 2001. Georgetown enjoyed conference wins over Fordham, Lafayette, Lehigh and Bucknell. The double OT win over Lehigh was GU’s first since 1925. Six Hoyas were named to All-Patriot League postseason teams.

In each of his first two seasons at the helm, Sgarlata guided a one-game improvement in the win column. In 2015, Georgetown took home the first Lou Little Trophy by beating Columbia and earned its first home victory over an Ivy League program, defeating Brown. Kyle Nolan became GU's all-time leader in pass attempts, completions and total
offense, earning an invitation to Baltimore Ravens Rookie Mini-Camp.

Alec May had an All-America season in 2014, setting the program's single-season sack record and leading the nation with 16.5, while Nick Alfieri became the third player in program history to eclipse 300 tackles. Both were named First Team All-Patriot League.

Sgarlata's emphasis on excellence in the classroom has shown as the program set a Patriot League record with 45 student-athletes on the Patriot League Academic Honor Roll in 2014. The Hoyas also had the highest academic progress rate (APR) in the Patriot League for two-straight academic years (2013-14 and 2014-15), scoring a perfect 1,000 in 2014-15.

Prior to being named head coach, Sgarlata had been on the Hoya coaching staff for 18 seasons, working with four different position groups and served as the assistant head coach and defensive coordinator for 10 seasons. During his tenure as defensive coordinator, he helped guide the Hoyas to the top-ranked scoring defense in the Patriot League in 2011 and the second-ranked scoring defense in 2012. The Hoyas featured four ECAC First Team selections and 20 All-Patriot League selections on defense.

Within the defense, Sgarlata coached All-Americans Michael Ononibaku (2005), Alex Buzbee (2006), Andrew Schaetzke (2011) and Robert McCabe (2012). Both Shaetzke and McCabe earned Patriot League Defensive Player of the year honors and Sgarlata also guided the 1996 Metro Atlantic Athletic Conference (MAAC) Defensive Player of the Year Janne Kouri.

Buzbee became the second Hoya in program history to make an NFL roster, suiting up for the Washington Redskins (2007-09). He also played for the Toronto Argonauts of the CFL from (2010-11).

While working on the offensive side of the ball, Sgarlata helped lead the Hoyas to consecutive MAAC Championships (1998, 1999) and an appearance in the 1998 ECAC Bowl. J.J. Mont was named the 1999 Co-Offensive Player of the Year and he coached Gharun Hester, Georgetown’s all-time leading receiver in yards (3,089) and touchdowns (39).

Sgarlata has also served as an academic advisor, career and alumni liaison, financial aid liaison, internship director and computer and technology liaison during his time with the football program.

A four-year letterwinner at Georgetown, Sgarlata is among the program's all-time leading rushers. He was a team captain as a senior in 1993 and received the John J. Hagerty Award. He excelled in the classroom, being named to the 1993 GTE District II Academic All-America Football Team and was also named to the MAAC Football League Academic All-Star Team.

Sgarlata graduated from Georgetown in 1994 from the College of Arts & Sciences with a degree in government and international relations. In May 2012, he completed his master's degree in sport industry management from Georgetown’s School of Continuing Studies.

Head coaching record

References

External links
 Georgetown profile

Year of birth missing (living people)
Living people
American football running backs
Georgetown Hoyas football coaches
Georgetown Hoyas football players